The 1988–89 Greek Football Cup was the 47th edition of the Greek Football Cup.

Tournament details

Totally 52 teams participated, 16 from Alpha Ethniki, 18 from Beta, and 18 from Gamma. It was held in 6 rounds, included final.

This season, for first time was established qualifying groups in the Group Stage, with Alpha Ethniki teams to be placed in the first pot. The groups would be supplemented by teams of lower divisions and the qualification would be gained by the two winners of each group. The inspiration for this process was taken by Coppa Italia and its main objective was the teams to play certain official matches before the beginning of European championships and Cups.

With various forms, the initial round of groups took place globally in 11 editions, until 2001-02 season. The unique Alpha Ethniki team that was eliminated this year by the round was Doxa Drama.

Afterwards, the competition was marked by eventful matches and false note, initially in Second Round and afterwards the elimination of Olympiacos by OFI and AEK Athens by Levadiakos, but mainly in the quarter-finals, when OFI were eliminated by Larissa, while after the end of second match there were clashes in the ground by footballers of both teams. Riots of lower intensity became after the end of match between Panionios and PAOK, in the same round.

Final was contested by Panathinaikos and Panionios. The two clubs were met again in a Greek Cup Final after 32 years. Panathinaikos, after Group Stage of groups, eliminated Olympiakos Volos, Panachaiki, PAS Giannina and Ethnikos Piraeus, while Panionios eliminated Sparti, Aris, PAOK and AEL. The Greens repeated the success of 1967, overcoming this time 3–1. For a second consecutive year, Dimitris Saravakos was the top scorer of the competition, with 7 goals.

Calendar

Group stage

The phase was played in a single round-robin format. Each win would gain 2 points, each draw 1 and each loss would not gain any point.

Group 1

Group 2

Group 3

Group 4

Group 5

Group 6

Group 7

Group 8

Group 9

Group 10

Group 11

Group 12

Group 13

Group 14

Group 15

Group 16

Knockout phase
Each tie in the knockout phase, apart from the final, was played over two legs, with each team playing one leg at home. The team that scored more goals on aggregate over the two legs advanced to the next round. If the aggregate score was level, the away goals rule was applied, i.e. the team that scored more goals away from home over the two legs advanced. If away goals were also equal, then extra time was played. The away goals rule was again applied after extra time, i.e. if there were goals scored during extra time and the aggregate score was still level, the visiting team advanced by virtue of more away goals scored. If no goals were scored during extra time, the winners were decided by a penalty shoot-out. In the final, which were played as a single match, if the score was level at the end of normal time, extra time was played, followed by a penalty shoot-out if the score was still level.The mechanism of the draws for each round is as follows:
There are no seedings, and teams from the same group can be drawn against each other.

Bracket

Round of 32

|}

Round of 16

|}

Quarter-finals

|}

Semi-finals

|}

Final

The 45th Greek Cup Final was played at the Olympic Stadium.

References

External links
Greek Cup 1988-89 at RSSSF

Greek Football Cup seasons
Greek Cup
Cup